Headcorn Junction railway station was the Kent and East Sussex Railway's northern terminus. It was adjacent to the South Eastern and Chatham Railway's  station. It opened in 1905 and closed in 1954.

History
The station was adjacent to the South Eastern and Chatham Railway's (SE&CR)  station. Passenger facilities comprised a small waiting room. This had originally stood at Tenterden Town, and was moved to Headcorn Junction when a new brick building was provided at Tenterden Town. The original junction between the K&ESR and SE&CR was on the Ashford side of the station.

In 1926, the Southern Railway, which had taken over the SE&CR in 1923, decided to rebuild their station at Headcorn to provide two through roads with platforms on passing loops. A new platform was provided for the K&ESR and the connection between the two railways was moved to the  side of Headcorn station. Work had been completed by 1930.  The K&ESR was absorbed into British Railways on 1 January 1948, becoming part of the Southern Region of British Railways. The station, and the line between Headcorn and Tenterden Town, were closed on 2 January 1954.

Notes

References

External links
 Headcorn Junction on navigable 1940 O.S. Map

Disused railway stations in Kent
Former Kent and East Sussex Railway stations
Railway stations in Great Britain opened in 1905
Railway stations in Great Britain closed in 1954
1905 establishments in England
1954 disestablishments in England